Cross Gene (Korean: 크로스진; stylized as CROSS GENE) is a 6 member boy band based in South Korea which debuted on June 11, 2012. Signed under Amuse Korea, the group consists of South Korean member: Shin is the only member still under their label, Amuse Korea. They released their debut mini-album Timeless: Begins in 2012, which peaked at #8 on the Gaon weekly album chart.

History

2012: Formation and Timeless: Begins
On May 26, 2012, Amuse Korea revealed that they would be debuting a multinational group consisting of South Korean, Japanese and Chinese singers. Among the members is Shin Won-ho (Shin), an actor who had previously appeared in television dramas and advertisements. Terada Takuya, an Amuse model and actor, was also announced in the lineup and upon Cross Gene's debut became the first fully Japanese K-Pop idol. The entertainment company explained the meaning behind the group's name, stating that the group would "cross the superior genes of each country to create one perfect group". Cross Gene originally consisted of three South Korean members, two Chinese members and one Japanese member.

On June 7, the group held their first showcase at the Ax Korea concert hall. They released their first mini-album Timeless: Begins on June 8. Ten days later, a limited edition version of the mini-album was released. Timeless: Begins debuted at #9 on the Gaon weekly albums chart, and peaked at #8 the following week.

2013: Member changes, Japanese promotions and With U
In January 2013, Amuse Korea announced that Seyoung would be joining Cross Gene as a new member. He replaced J.G., who left Cross Gene to start a career as a solo artist. Following J.G.'s departure, Takuya stepped down as the leader and the position was given to Shin instead.

On February 27, Cross Gene released their Japanese debut single, "Shooting Star". The song was performed for the first time during a promotional event for the Korean drama Big in Japan. Their Japanese single album was released on March 13, followed by the digital single "Crazy" on the May 29. On May 31, Cross Gene held their first Japanese Concert, Cross U, at Shibuya O-East, during which the group spoke about J.G. leaving and the change in leadership.

On August 1, Cross Gene released the digital single "Dirty Pop", followed by a special photobook CD, With U. The photobook was a limited release that was not made available outside of concert venues until late 2014. Cross Gene held two more concerts – With U on 22 August at Shibuya Public Hall and an encore performance on 31 August at Umeda Club Quattro. The Shibuya Public Hall concert would later be released on DVD in the same photobook format as the With U EP.

Cross Gene Planet, the official Japanese fansite, was launched on September 2. During the latter part of the year Cross Gene released three more digital singles in Japan: "My Love Song" in October, "Page of Love" in November and "Aurora" in December. During November, Cross Gene also started activities in China, performing for ATV at the Mr. Asia contest. They also held a fanmeeting and performance at the Dragon Centre in Hong Kong. On November 28, Cross Gene received a Rookie Award at the 21st Korean Culture and Entertainment Awards.

Cross Gene's third Japan live performance, Rock U, was held on December 6 at Umeda Club Quattro and on December 14 and 15 as part of Amuse Musical Theatre. Following the conclusion of Rock U, the group hinted at an upcoming project – Project Z. They also participated in the concert Super Handsome Live 2013 on December 26 and 27 as a supporting act.

2014: Digital singles, ZEDD and other appearances

In early 2014, Cross Gene travelled to Los Angeles to film for the movie ZEDD.

On April 6, a visual teaser for the single"Amazing (Bad Lady)" was uploaded onto the official YouTube followed by a music video teaser on the 14th. Their comeback was initially scheduled for April 21 but was delayed out of respect for the victims and families of the Sewol ferry disaster.

On May 29, Cross Gene returned to Hong Kong to perform for ATV's 50th Anniversary special. They also held a second fan meeting and performance at the Dragon Centre in Hong Kong.

The group released the Korean digital single "Amazing (Bad Lady)" on June 9, following a nearly 2-year absence. However, Casper was missing from all related promotions after suffering a hip/lower back injury. On June 26, Cross Gene released a music video for the Korean version of "Shooting Star". On June 28, they held their fourth live Japanese performance Amazing de Show at Differ Ariake Arena in Tokyo. Casper was able to return and perform with them. Another show, Cross Show: ZEDD, was announced for October. During July and August, Cross Gene participated in Japanese music festivals including Amuse BBQ 2014, Summer Sonic in Osaka, and as the opening act for Asia Departure on A-Nation Island. Takuya also joined the Korean television show Non-Summit as the representative for Japan.

On 10 September, Cross Gene released the music video for "Billion Dolla", the theme track for their movie ZEDD, which was released on DVD on September 24. Cross Gene performed Cross Show: Zedd in Tokyo on October 12 and 13 with a total of four shows over two days. During Cross Show: Zedd, they also announced a Japanese comeback scheduled for January 14, 2015 with a new single titled "Future". They also posted a notice on their Korean fancafe the following day for an intended Korean comeback in November 2014. On November 10, Cross Gene released their second digital single "I'm Not a Boy, Not Yet a Man".

Cross Gene's main vocalists, Seyoung and Yongseok, were both cast in separate theatre performances starting from November. Cross Gene also performed at Skechers Sundown Festival in Singapore on November 22 and as part of Super Handsome Live 2014 on December 26, 27 and 28 at Pacifico Yokohama.

2015: Japanese and Korean promotions

Shin was scheduled as a regular for FM Yokohama's Aja Aja Friday and Seyoung continued performing for the Korean Stage Musical Bachelor's Vegetable Store for their Japanese performances. Cross Gene's second Japanese single "Future" was released on January 14. It ranked at #4 on the Oricon's Daily Singles chart, peaking at #3 five days later. Future also ranked #5 on the Oricon Weekly singles chart. Aja Aja Friday finished airing at the end of March and Shin moved to his own show Shin-Kun no Yoru no Chuusday to air at 11:30pm every Tuesday night on FM Yokohama.

Cross Gene next returned to Korea with "Play With Me" on April 12, also releasing their third mini album of the same name. Play With Me entered GAON Albums Chart at #7 on the Weekly Chart. "Play With Me" was also nominated for Song of the Week on SBS MTV The Show three times during its promotional run.

Following this, Cross Gene returned to Japan with their third single "Love & Peace", a track that featured on the OST for Dual Master Revolution. The single, released on July 25, was the first single that they had written the lyrics for. The physical release of Love & Peace was postponed briefly and it was announced that it would be released as a double-A side single with the track "Shi-Tai!" as well as a previously announced track, "Miracle", on October 7. "Miracle" was the second song released that was written by the Cross Gene members. Love & Peace/Shi-Tai! debuted on Oricon Daily Singles chart at 2nd, peaking at #1. It placed at #2 on the weekly chart and at #74 on Oricon Yearly Singles Chart.

Cross Gene held their first concert in Korea, Be Happy Together Live (Xmas Eve Eve Night) on December 23. The tickets for the concert sold out within the first minute. This was the first of two concerts, the second to be held in Japan in the new year.

2016–2017: Game, Ying Yang and Mirror 
On January 21, 2016, Cross Gene released their third mini album Game, along with a music video for the title track "Noona, You".

In June 2016, Cross Gene released their first full-length Japanese album, Ying Yang. The album consisted of 14 tracks including the title track "Ying Yang", a song for the fans, "Tegami" ("letter" in Japanese), and five other previously unreleased songs: "Keep on Dancing", "Love Game", "Sobani Ite", "Dreamer" and "No No No". Shin was also scheduled to play Tae Oh in the Korean drama Legend of the Blue Sea, starring alongside Lee Min-ho and Jun Ji-hyun. The drama aired its first episode on November 16, 2016, and its last episode on January 25, 2017.

Cross Gene's fourth mini album Mirror was released on February 8 with a title track called "Black or White".

On August 31 it was revealed that Chinese member Casper had left the group. Their company announced that it had no plans of adding new members and that they'd stay as a 5-member group.

Shortly after, on September 8, it was announced that members Seyoung, Sangmin and Yongseok would be members of a new sub-unit, X HEARTS (크로스하츠). They held 4 mini-lives, titled U&I=ONE, in 3 different cities: Jeonju (September 16), Busan (September 17), and two more on September 24 in Seoul. Member Shin also is scheduled to appear in upcoming drama 20th Century Boy and Girl as Han Ye-seul's younger brother, Sa Min-ho. Its first episode was scheduled to air on October 2, but got postponed. The first 4 episodes aired on Monday, October 9.

2018-Present: Zero, more individual activities 
In February 2018, member Yongseok participated in the Japanese musical My Bucket List as Kanggu, together with Taewoong (Snuper), Injun (DGNA) and musical actors Minsu and Kim Namho. In the same month it was also announced that CROSS GENE would have a concert in Japan titled Utopia, on April 30.

On April 23, the first teaser for CROSS GENE's long awaited Korean comeback dropped. Their 5th Korean mini-album titled Zero would be released on May 8. Zero has 4 tracks, 2 of which are the title tracks. Along with the songs are 2 official M/Vs (Touch It, Fly), 1 short video (Dystopia) and 1 self-directed M/V by the members (Believe Me). One of the songs on the album, Dystopia, was pre-released on April 30. At the showcase for Zero, Shin revealed that he was going to play a role in upcoming K-drama Risky Romance. In it, he plays Choi Jae-seung.

Takuya was set to play Abraham again in the Japanese version of the musical Altar Boyz. He played the same role in the 2017 version of it, too. Yongseok would play in another Japanese musical as well, titled Voice. In August, Yongseok played in My Bucket List again, though this time the opposing side of his first role, Haegi. The other leads in this musical were Karam (DGNA), Sunwoo (Boys Republic) and again, musical actor Kim Namho. Seyoung is set to play Puck in the Japanese musical Shakespeare's A Midsummer Night's Dream, from September 14 until September 17.

On December 10, it was revealed that Takuya left the group to pursue acting and modelling.

On December 30, 2019 it was announced that members Sangmin and Yongseok have decided not to renew their contracts. Group activities are temporarily suspended too due to enlistment but they will discuss the group's future upon discharge.

On March 24, 2020, Sangmin officially enter the military and will be discharge on September 29, 2021.

On November 17, 2020, Yongseok officially enter the military and will be discharge on May 16, 2022.

On November 18, 2020, Shin share a letter for the fans that he made his military enlistment last October 19, 2020 as a public service. The report was delayed due to Shin's will to enter quietly. He will be discharge on July 18, 2022.

On December 9, 2020, member Seyoung announced his departure from Cross Gene. Seyoung open a YouTube channel "Coiblen" for his vlogs and cover songs videos.

Members

Current 
 Shin (Hangul: 신)
 Sangmin (Hangul: 상민)
 Yongseok (Hangul: 용석)

Former
 Casper (Hangul: 캐스퍼)
 J.G (Hangul: 제이지)
 Takuya (Hangul : 타쿠야)
 Seyoung (Hangul: 세영)

Discography

Studio albums

Extended plays

Singles

DVDs

Music videos

Filmography
Note: For individual members' filmographies, see their articles.

Concerts
Cross Gene 1st Concert In Japan "Cross U" (2013)
Cross Gene 2nd Concert In Japan "With U" (2013)
Cross Gene Live In Japan "Rock U" (2013)
Cross Gene Concert In Japan "Cross Show: Zedd" (2014)
Cross Gene Concert In Seoul "Be Happy Together - X Mas Eve Night" (2015)
Cross Gene Live In Japan "Be Happy Together - New Year Luv Night (2016)
Cross Gene Live "Mirror" (2017)
Cross Gene Japan Live "Utopia" (2018)

Awards and nominations

Korea Cultural Entertainment Awards 

|-
| 2013
| Cross Gene
| K-Pop Rookie Award
|

References

External links
  
  

K-pop music groups
Musical groups established in 2012
South Korean boy bands
South Korean pop music groups
2012 establishments in South Korea
Asian Wave contestants
Amuse Inc. artists